Opacinota is a genus of tortoise beetles in the family Chrysomelidae, containing a single species, O. bisignata.

References

Further reading

 
 
 
 

Cassidinae
Beetles described in 1855
Monotypic Chrysomelidae genera
Articles created by Qbugbot